The 16th Sarasaviya Awards festival, presented by the Associated Newspapers of Ceylon Limited, was held to honor the best films of 1987 Sinhala cinema on July 23, 1988, at the Bandaranaike Memorial International Conference Hall, Colombo 07, Sri Lanka. Minister of National Defense, Trade and Shipping Lalith Athulathmudali was the chief guest at the awards night.

The film Viragaya won most number of awards with twelve awards including Best Film, Best Director and Best Actor.

Awards

References

Sarasaviya Awards
Sarasaviya